Jonathan Dobing Bean (born 20 August 1964) is an English cricketer.  Bean is a right-handed batsman who occasionally fields as a wicket-keeper.  He was born in Altrincham, Cheshire.

Bean made his debut for Cheshire in the 1990 Minor Counties Championship against the Cornwall.  Bean played Minor counties cricket for Cheshire from 1990 to 2000, including 80 Minor Counties Championship matches and 21 MCCA Knockout Trophy matches.  In 1992, he made his List A debut against Gloucestershire in the NatWest Trophy.  He played seven further List A matches for Cheshire, the last coming against Kent in the 1999 NatWest Trophy.  In his eight List A matches, he scored 77 runs at a batting average of 9.62, with a high score of 22.  In the field he took 7 catches.

References

External links
Jonathan Bean at ESPNcricinfo
Jonathan Bean at CricketArchive

1964 births
Living people
People from Altrincham
English cricketers
Cheshire cricketers